The Smash Diva Championship was a women's professional wrestling championship, owned by the Japanese Smash promotion. Championship reigns were determined by professional wrestling matches, in which competitors were involved in scripted rivalries. These narratives created feuds between the various competitors, which cast them as villains and heroines.

Tournament
The tournament to crown the inaugural champion was held over three months and four events. The first round was held over two events, Smash.18 and Smash.19 on June 9 and July 15, 2011, with the semis on Smash.20 on August 11, 2011, and the final on Smash.21 on September 8, 2011.

The tournament brackets were:

Title history

Combined reigns

See also
Smash (professional wrestling)
Smash Championship
WNC Women's Championship

References

Women's professional wrestling championships